The Harpoon 6.2 is an American trailerable sailboat that was designed by C&C Design of Canada, as a racer and first built in 1979.

Production
The design was built by Boston Whaler in the United States between 1979 and 1983, with 150 boats completed, but it is now out of production.

Design
The Harpoon 6.2 is a recreational keelboat, built predominantly of fiberglass, with wood trim. The construction was fiberglass over a thick foam core for stiffness and which also renders the boat unsinkable. It has a fractional sloop rig, a raked stem, a plumb transom, a transom-hung rudder controlled by a tiller and a fixed fin keel. It displaces  and carries  of ballast.

The design has sleeping accommodation for two people, with a double "V"-berth in the bow cabin. The galley is located on both sides just forward of the companionway ladder. The galley is equipped with a two-burner stove on the starboard side and a sink to port. An anchor locker is provided in the bow.

For sailing downwind the design may be equipped with a symmetrical spinnaker.

Operational history
In a 2010 review Steve Henkel wrote, "for a few years in the early 1980s, Boston Whaler went into she sailboat business, producing a '5.2' (17 feet long) and '6.2' ... Best features: The Harpoon 6.2 comes close to the best racing sailers among her comp[etitor]s, the Antrim 20 and the Mystic Mini-Ton 21, but we don't think she makes the grade in terms of beauty or grace. Worst features: A short waterline and relatively shallower and lighter ballast keeps her racing performance from equalling the Antrim or the Mini-Ton. Space below is equal to the roomy Antrim, but is not laid out as well—and includes only two berths, not four as with all her comp[etitor]s. Prices for used boats may be higher than what may seem rational, based on the hypnotic drawing power of the Boston Whaler name."

See also
List of sailing boat types

References

External links
Photo of a Harpoon 6.2

Keelboats
1970s sailboat type designs
Sailing yachts
Trailer sailers
Sailboat type designs by C&C Design
Sailboat types built by Boston Whaler